Zonites is a genus of mostly small, air-breathing land snails, terrestrial pulmonate gastropod mollusks in the family Zonitidae. The genus Zonites, which includes 26 extant species, is distributed in the northeastern Mediterranean area and exhibits significant diversity and endemism.

Description
The shell of species in this genus is more or less transparent, subdepressed and contains an umbilicus. The aperture is semilunar and usually lacks teeth. The outer lip is thin and sharp.

The animal is elongate and is able to retract completely within its shell. It has a more or less developed caudal mucous pit. The mantle lobes are small and not reflected on to the shell. The genital orifice is somewhat distant from the right tentacle. The jaw is marked by a median rostrum. The lateral teeth of the radula are bicuspidate, while the marginal teeth are sharp and narrowly unicuspidate.

Species
Species within the genus Zonites include:
 Zonites algirus (Linnaeus, 1758) - type species
 Zonites anaphiensis Riedel & Mylonas, 1981
 Zonites astakidae Riedel, 1985
 Zonites caricus (Roth, 1839)
 Zonites casius Martens, 1889
 Zonites chloroticus (Pfeiffer, 1851)
 Zonites embolium Fuchs & Käufel, 1936
 Zonites embolium elevatus Riedel & Mylonas, 1997 - extinct
 Zonites euboeicus Kobelt, 1878
 Zonites festae Pollonera, 1916
 Zonites graecus Kobelt, 1876
 Zonites humilis Riedel, 1982
 Zonites invitus Riedel & Mylonas, 1995
 Zonites kobelti Kobelt, 1898
 Zonites labiosus Westerlund, 1893
 Zonites messenicus Zilch, 1965
 Zonites nautarum Riedel & Mylonas, 1995
 Zonites nikariae Pfeffer, 1930
 Zonites nisyrius Riedel & Mylonas, 1997
 Zonites oertzeni Martens, 1889
 Zonites osmanicus Riedel, 1987
 Zonites parnonensis Riedel, 1985
 Zonites pergranulatus Kobelt, 1878
 Zonites rhodius Martens, 1889
 Zonites santoriniensis Riedel & Norris, 1987 - extinct
 Zonites sariae Riedel, 1985
 Zonites siphnicus Fuchs & Käufel, 1936 - extinct
 Zonites smyrnensis (Roth, 1839)

References

 
Gastropod genera
Taxonomy articles created by Polbot